Toby Chauncy (2 February 1674 – 1733), of Edgcote, Northamptonshire, was a British lawyer and  politician who sat in the House of Commons from 1730 to 1733.

Chauncy was the eldest surviving son of Toby Chauncy of Edgcote and his second wife  Joan Paul, daughter  of William Paul, Bishop of Oxford. He matriculated at Corpus Christi College, Oxford on 6 November 1690. He was admitted to Inner Temple and called to the bar in 1699.  He or his father had stood unsuccessfully for Banbury at the 1705 English general election. By 1717, Chauncy  was Recorder of Banbury. He succeeded his father to Edgcote on 4 March 1725.

Chauncy wrote to Lord Guildford,  on 24 October1729, offering to replace him as MP for Banbury on his elevation to the peerage. Guildford chose William Knollys, known as Lord Wallingford, as his nominee instead, but Chauncy stood at the by-election on 21 January 1730  and was returned as Member of Parliament with the support of the corporation, winning the contest by one vote. There is no record of his voting in any division.

Chauncy died unmarried on  27 March 1733. Edgcote House descended to Richard Chauncey in 1742 who built a new mansion between 1747 and 1752.

References

1674 births
1733 deaths
Members of the Parliament of Great Britain for English constituencies
British MPs 1727–1734